The men's 1500 metres event  at the Friendship Games was held on 18 August 1984 at the Grand Arena of the Central Lenin Stadium in Moscow, Soviet Union.

Results

See also
Athletics at the 1984 Summer Olympics – Men's 1500 metres

References
 

Athletics at the Friendship Games
Friendship Games